Onrea Jones (born December 22, 1983) is a former American  football wide receiver. He was signed by the Houston Texans as an undrafted free agent in 2007. He played college football at Hampton.

Jones was a member of the San Diego Chargers, Green Bay Packers, Indianapolis Colts, Washington Redskins, Arizona Cardinals, Chicago Bears, Hamilton Tiger-Cats and Ottawa Redblacks.

External links
Hamilton Tiger-Cats bio
Arizona Cardinals bio
Hampton Pirates bio
Indianapolis Colts bio

1983 births
Living people
People from Clarksville, Tennessee
Players of American football from Tennessee
American football wide receivers
Hampton Pirates football players
Houston Texans players
San Diego Chargers players
Green Bay Packers players
Indianapolis Colts players
Arizona Cardinals players
Washington Redskins players
Chicago Bears players
Hamilton Tiger-Cats players
Ottawa Redblacks players